Karlin is a surname tracing back to the Hasidic dynasty originating with Rebbe Aaron the Great of Karlin in present-day Belarus. Alternate derivations have the name with origins from the Carolus, a Latin name that means Charles. Notable people with the surname include:

 Alma Karlin, Slovene-Austrian traveler, writer, poet, collector, polyglot and theosophist.
 Ben Karlin
 John Karlin, industrial psychologist
 Joyce Karlin
 Kenneth Karlin, Danish songwriter and producer
 Miriam Karlin
 Ored Karlin (1905–1969), Swedish chess player
 Samuel Karlin
 William Karlin (1882–1944), New York lawyer and Socialist politician

See also

Karli (name)
Karlie
Karlik (name)
Karlina
Karline
Karlijn
Karlyn
Karolin (name)